Spiromicrovirus is a genus of viruses, in the family Microviridae, in the subfamily Gokushovirinae. Spiroplasma bacteria serve as natural hosts. There is only one species in this genus:  Spiroplasma virus SpV4.

Structure
Viruses in Spiromicrovirus are non-enveloped, with icosahedral and round geometries, and T=1 symmetry. The diameter is around 30 nm. Genomes are circular, around 6.1kb in length.

Life cycle
Viral replication is cytoplasmic. Entry into the host cell is achieved by pilus-mediated adsorption into the host cell. Replication follows the ssDNA rolling circle model. DNA-templated transcription is the method of transcription. The virus exits the host cell by bacteria lysis.
Spiroplasma bacteria serve as the natural host.

References

External links
 Viralzone: Spiromicrovirus
 ICTV

Gokushovirinae
Virus genera